The First League of the Republika Srpska ( / ) is a second level football competition in Bosnia and Herzegovina.

The league champion is promoted to the Premier League of Bosnia and Herzegovina. Relegated teams, depending on how many get relegated, fall to the Second League of the Republika Srpska.

History

Separate and second tier league
Since there were three different football championships in the country, organized on ethnic principles, the "First League of the Republika Srpska" was the top flight in the Republika Srpska before 2002. However, the champions of this League were not recognized by UEFA. In 2002, the top clubs from the Republika Srpska joined the Premier League of Bosnia and Herzegovina and the First League was kept as one of two second level divisions. It is still run by the Football Association of Republika Srpska, and has ended its boycott of Bosnian football on a federal level.

New format and expansion
The league changed format in the 2014–15 season and was split into two stages, the regular season and the playoffs. Each of the 12 competitors in the First League hosts every other team once in the regular season, for a total of 22 matches. A playoff phase is then played from April to May. The point system in the championship playoff is the same as during the regular season, except that each team starts with half of the points they won in the regular season, rounded up to the nearest integer. The points gained by rounding are deducted in the case of a tie. Similar systems are also used in the Belgian First Division A and the Polish Ekstraklasa.

The top six teams from the regular season enter the championship playoff, with the first-placed team winning the First League and teams ranked from 7 to 12 after the regular season enter the relegation playoffs. Each team plays their opponents once. The League champion is promoted to the Premier League at the end of the season, and the bottom clubs are relegated to the Second League of the Republika Srpska (third level). The number of relegated teams depends on how many clubs are entering the league. Those are the winners of the two third level league groups, the winner of the relegation play-off, and Republika Srpska clubs relegated from the Premier League. So, sometimes two clubs get relegated, and sometimes three or even four.

On 12 June 2020, it was confirmed that the league will be expanded from 10 to 16 teams in the 2020–21 season.

Member clubs for 2020–21

League champions
Previous champions and winners of the league are:

Since the 2002–03 season, it became a second national level competition. League champion gets direct promotion to the Premier League.

2002–03 - Modriča
2003–04 - Slavija Sarajevo
2004–05 - Radnik Bijeljina
2005–06 - Borac Banja Luka
2006–07 - Laktaši
2007–08 - Borac Banja Luka
2008–09 - Rudar Prijedor
2009–10 - Drina Zvornik
2010–11 - Kozara Gradiška
2011–12 - Radnik Bijeljina
2012–13 - Mladost Velika Obarska
2013–14 - Drina Zvornik
2014–15 - Rudar Prijedor
2015–16 - Krupa
2016–17 - Borac Banja Luka
2017–18 - Zvijezda 09
2018–19 - Borac Banja Luka
2019–20 - Krupa
2020–21 - Rudar Prijedor
2021–22 -

Performance by club

References

External links
Football Association of Republika Srpska 

 

    
2
1
Bos
Recurring sporting events established in 1995
1995 establishments in Bosnia and Herzegovina